Butcher's wart is a cutaneous (skin) condition with a prevalence of 8.5% to 23.8% among butchers and other meat-handling professions caused by a small group of viruses that infect the skin.

An association with Human Papillomavirus 7 has been suggested.

See also 
 List of cutaneous conditions

References 

Virus-related cutaneous conditions
Papillomavirus-associated diseases